Fawn Lake Forest is a census-designated place located in Lackawaxen Township, Pike County in the state of Pennsylvania.  The community is located north of Pennsylvania Route 590 in northeastern Pike County, near the New York line.  As of the 2010 census the population was 755 residents.

Demographics

References

Census-designated places in Pike County, Pennsylvania
Census-designated places in Pennsylvania